Banca del Monte di Foggia S.p.A. also known as Banca del Monte "Domenico Siniscalco-Ceci" di Foggia in honor a sponsor , was an Italian regional bank based in Foggia, Apulia region.

Due to Legge Amato, the statutory corporation was split into a Società per Azioni and a banking foundation on 6 December 1994. The bank sector was sold in 1998 and absorbed into Banca della Campania on 28 December 2006, both as a subsidiary of Banca Popolare dell'Emilia Romagna. Fondazione Banca del Monte di Foggia, still acts as a charity organization.

References

External links
 Fondazione Banca del Monte di Foggia 

Organizations established in the 1580s
1588 establishments in Italy
Banks disestablished in 2006
Italian companies disestablished in 2006
Defunct banks of Italy
Companies based in Apulia
Foggia
BPER Banca
Mounts of piety